Lauren Strahm (born October 10, 1990), better known by her stage name Fleurie, is an American musician from Nashville, Tennessee. Her first album, Love and War, was released on September 19, 2016. Songs from the album have been featured in Marvel's Cloak & Dagger, Reign, Bones, Pretty Little Liars, Saving Hope, Queen Sugar, Scream, Shadowhunters, and Station 19, among others. Fleurie toured internationally including headline dates in China and support dates with Owl City in Japan and South Korea in November 2018.

Early life
Strahm was born on October 10, 1990, in a suburb of Detroit. She began writing songs at age 11 but did not share them with anyone until she was 17. At age 19, she released a Christian album under her birth name.

At age 21 she chose to move to Nashville after college to pursue music as a career.

Career
In 2013 Strahm put out the first release under the Fleurie moniker, an EP entitled Fear and Fable. This was followed by the 2015 EP Arrows. Off of that album, "Still Your Girl" was selected by NPR for their Songs We Love series, a part of the All Songs Considered podcast. "Wildwood" was featured in Containment, Wynonna Earp, and Finding Carter, as well as "Sparks" being featured in Catfish: The TV Show.

In 2015 she collaborated with hip-hop artist NF on his song "Mansion" (which peaked at 30 on the Billboard Hot Christian Songs chart), the second track on his record of the same name which reached 62 on the Billboard 200. Fleurie later opened for NF on a US tour in 2016.

Her debut full-length Love and War was released on September 19, 2016. Songs "Breathe", "Love and War", "Soldier", "Turns You into Stone", and "Hurts Like Hell" have been featured in numerous TV shows including Outlander, Assassins Creed, Pretty Little Liars, Finding Carter, Shadowhunters: The Mortal Instruments and The Originals, as well as the trailer for the twelfth and final season of Bones.

The song "Don't Let Me Down", off of her album Love and War was sampled by Kendrick Lamar on his song "FEEL". This track appears on his 2017 album DAMN.

In 2018, she collaborated with producer Tommee Profitt and Mellen Gi on a cover of Linkin Park's 2001 single "In the End". As of May 2021, the video of the cover has 714 million views on YouTube.

In 2018, she collaborated with electronic pop artist Ruelle on her song "Carry You" which was used in Shadowhunters.

On August 17, 2018 Fleurie released her second full-length album, Portals. Her song, Out of the Blue was featured on S15 Premiere, E1 of Grey's Anatomy on September 27, 2018.

In 2019 Fleurie's song "Love and War" was featured as the theme song for the True Crime podcast "To Live and Die in LA". A cover was then used in Westworld in 2022, but it does not appear on the Season 4 OST.

On April 30, 2020, "Breathe" was remixed by the Riot Music Team for the official launch video of Riot Studio's game Legends of Runeterra.

On November 12, 2020, "Hurricane" was used as theme song for the trailer of "Black Beauty" by Disney+.

Fleurie announced on June 1, 2021 on Instagram that she's opening for Colony House (band) as part of a North American tour.

Discography

References

1989 births
Living people
Musicians from Nashville, Tennessee
21st-century American women musicians
Musicians from Detroit